Alusine Kamara (born 5 September 1989) is a retired footballer who played two matches as a midfielder for Syrianska FC in the Swedish Allsvenskan, as well as once for the Sierra Leonean national team.

Life and career 
Kamara played for Freetown club FC Kallon, whom he represented in the Sierra Leone National Premier League and the African Champions League. In 2011, he agreed a loan move to Swedish Division 1 Södra (third tier) side Motala AIF, where he scored six goals in 13 appearances.

Following a summer 2011 trial with recently promoted Allsvenskan side Syrianska FC, Kamara agreed a transfer to — and a three and a half year contract with — the top-tier club on 10 August 2011. He made his first Allsvenskan start a few days later in a 3–0 defeat to Mjällby AIF.

Kamara was also capped once football for Sierra Leone. His debut came in a February 2011 friendly match 2–1 defeat against Nigeria in Lagos. He was also called up by Sierra Leone's Swedish manager Lars Olof Mattsson to participate in a May 2011 training camp.

References

External links
 

1989 births
Living people
Sportspeople from Freetown
Sierra Leonean footballers
F.C. Kallon players
Motala AIF players
Syrianska FC players
Sierra Leone international footballers
Ettan Fotboll players
Allsvenskan players
Association football midfielders
Sierra Leonean expatriate footballers
Expatriate footballers in Sweden
Sierra Leonean expatriate sportspeople in Sweden